Henry Dawson may refer to:

 Henry Dawson (cricketer) (1791–1889), amateur English cricketer
 Henry Dawson (artist) (1811–1878), English landscape painter
 Henry B. Dawson (1821–1889), English-born American historian
 Henry Gordon Dawson (1862–1918), Irish mathematician
 Henry Richard Dawson (1792–1840), Church of Ireland priest and antiquarian
 Henry Ward Dawson (1890–1963), American tennis player
 Henry Dawson (Australian politician) (1849–1919), New South Wales colonial politician
 Henry Dawson (MP), member of parliament for Cumberland

See also
Harry Dawson (disambiguation)
Henry Dawson-Damer